The 2018 Advance Auto Parts Clash was a Monster Energy NASCAR Cup Series race held on February 11, 2018, at Daytona International Speedway in Daytona Beach, Florida. Contested over 75 laps, it was the first exhibition race of the 2018 Monster Energy NASCAR Cup Series season.

Report

Background

The track, Daytona International Speedway, is one of six superspeedways to hold NASCAR races, the others being Michigan International Speedway, Auto Club Speedway, Indianapolis Motor Speedway, Pocono Raceway and Talladega Superspeedway. The standard track at Daytona International Speedway is a four–turn superspeedway that is  The track's turns are banked at 31 degrees, while the front stretch, the location of the finish line, is banked at 18 degrees.

Format and eligibility
The race is 75 laps in length, and is divided into two segments; the first is 25 laps and the second is 50 laps. The race is open to those drivers who won a pole in the 2017 season or had won "The Clash" previously.

The 2018 Clash at Daytona will not be a predetermined number of cars; rather, the field is limited to drivers who meet more exclusive criteria. Only drivers who were 2017 Pole Award winners, former Clash race winners, former Daytona 500 pole winners who competed full–time in 2017 and drivers who qualified for the 2017 Playoffs are eligible.

Entry list

Practice

Starting lineup
The lineup was determined by random draw, with Austin Dillon drawing the top spot.

Race
Austin Dillon led the field to the green flag. He would lead the first lap of the race, as Denny Hamlin would pass him just after the start finish line to take over the lead. By lap 6, the field quickly became mostly single file on the top lane. On lap 7 heading into turn 1, Kyle Larson, who was running 5th at that time, made contact with Ricky Stenhouse Jr. which resulted in Larson getting loose onto the apron and back up the track to save it, but fell all the way back to 16th. On lap 10, the field suddenly became double wide in front as Chase Elliott was able to pass Hamlin for the lead. Elliott would be challenged by Austin Dillon for the lead side by side for the next several laps, but Elliott would manage to hang on with the lead. By lap 22, Elliott would again be challenged for the lead this time with Joey Logano, who was running near the front the whole time, with Logano taking over the lead on lap 24 after a push from Martin Truex Jr. On lap 25, all but Kyle Larson, Kevin Harvick, Ricky Stenhouse Jr., Ryan Newman, and Jamie McMurray pitted for fuel and tires. Brad Keselowski was first off of pit road after only taking two tires as the competition caution came out on lap 26. The drivers who didn't pit before the caution ended up pitting for service. Jimmie Johnson was busted after driving through too many pit boxes and would restart at the tail end of the field.

The race restarted with 46 to go as Keselowski the leader. On lap 33, Chase Elliott got shuffled out of line while running 2nd and would fall back to 7th. The second caution came out on lap 34  when Jamie McMurray got side drafted by Kurt Busch which caused Jamie to get loose and spin into the outside wall, causing significant damage to the right front.

The race restarted with 37 to go with Keselowski leading. With 33 to go, Martin Truex Jr., came up behind Keselowski to take over the lead for a brief moment, when Keselowski passed Truex on the same lap. At the same time, Ricky Stenhouse Jr. got forced below the double yellow line and passed Kyle Busch when he was below the line. He would be assessed a drive-thru penalty that would ultimately eliminate him out of contention. The field became single file once again with 29 to go.

With 8 laps to go, the field was still running single file as Brad Keselowski stayed in the lead. His car picked up a big piece of debris that covered a third of his grille, but that didn't really affect him during the race. At 2 laps to go, Austin Dillon was first to make a second lane from the 8th position as Chase Elliott joined him in the inside lane. On the white flag, Ryan Blaney attempted to make a move on the inside, but Keselowski blocked Blaney. On the back straightaway, Kyle Larson bumped Jimmie Johnson into the outside wall creating a multi-car crash collecting Kasey Kahne, Martin Truex Jr., Chase Elliott, and Kyle Busch. This brought out the final caution and Keselowski was ahead of the wreck and drove on to his first Clash victory.

Race results

Media
FS1 covered the race on the television side; Mike Joy, Darrell Waltrip and Jeff Gordon handled the call in the booth for the race; Matt Yocum, Jamie Little and Vince Welch handled pit road for the television side.

Television

Radio

References

2018 Monster Energy NASCAR Cup Series
2018 in sports in Florida
February 2018 sports events in the United States
NASCAR races at Daytona International Speedway